Jenő Kalmár (21 March 1908 – 13 January 1990), also referred to as János Kalmar or Kálmár Jenő, was a former Hungarian footballer and coach. As a player, Kalmar played for both MTK Hungária FC and Hungary. During the 1928-29 season he finished as top goalscorer for MTK, scoring 20 goals.

In the early 1950s, Kálmár was manager at Honvéd and with a team that included Ferenc Puskás, Zoltán Czibor, Sándor Kocsis, József Bozsik, László Budai, Gyula Lóránt and Gyula Grosics, he guided them to four Hungarian League titles. As the Honvéd manager, he also played a prominent role in the development of the legendary Hungary team known as the Mighty Magyars and during this era he also served as an assistant coach to the national team coach, Gusztáv Sebes. At the end of Second World War he found himself in Yugoslavia and he joined third league side FK TSC Bačka Topola, known at time as Egység.

After the Hungarian Revolution, Kálmár like his former players, Puskás, Czibor and Kocsis, ended up in Spain where he managed several La Liga clubs with moderate success. He coached Wacker Wien, and after a brief spell at Sevilla CF, he guided Granada CF to the 1959 Copa del Generalísimo final. They lost 4-1 to a CF Barcelona team that included Kocsis. Kocsis  scored twice for Barça while  the Granada CF goal was scored by Arsenio Iglesias. In 1967, Kálmár took RCD Español to third in La Liga and during two spells with CD Málaga in the 1970s he guided them to promotion twice.

Honours

Manager
Honvéd
Hungarian League: 1950, 1952, 1954, 1955

Granada
Copa del Generalísimo: Runner-up 1959

CD Málaga
Segunda División: Runner-up 1970, 1979

Player
MTK Hungária
Hungarian League: Runner-up 1928-29, 1930–31, 1932–33, 1939-40
Hungarian Cup: 1931-32

See also
 List of Eastern Bloc defectors

References

External links
 
La Liga manager stats
 Sevilla CF
Jenő Kalmár Hungarian league stats at nela.hu

1908 births
1990 deaths
Association football forwards
Hungarian footballers
Hungary international footballers
MTK Budapest FC players
Excelsior AC (France) players
RC Roubaix players
Stade de Reims players
Ligue 1 players
Ligue 2 players
Hungarian football managers
Hungarian expatriate football managers
Budapest Honvéd FC managers
La Liga managers
Granada CF managers
Sevilla FC managers
Real Zaragoza managers
RCD Espanyol managers
CD Málaga managers
FC Porto managers
Halmstads BK managers
Hungarian refugees
Hungarian defectors
Hércules CF managers
FK TSC Bačka Topola players
Expatriate football managers in Austria
Expatriate football managers in Portugal
Expatriate football managers in Spain
Expatriate football managers in Sweden
Hungarian expatriate sportspeople in Austria
Hungarian expatriate sportspeople in Portugal
Hungarian expatriate sportspeople in Spain
Hungarian expatriate sportspeople in Sweden
Expatriate footballers in Yugoslavia
Hungarian expatriate sportspeople in Yugoslavia
Nemzeti Bajnokság I managers